Micromonospora ovatispora is a bacterium from the genus Micromonospora which has been isolated from mangrove soil in Sanya, China.

References

 

Micromonosporaceae
Bacteria described in 2016